Speakers of the Supreme Council of Kyrgyzstan, the unicameral parliament, have been:

References

Government of Kyrgyzstan
Chairmen of the Supreme Council (Kyrgyzstan)
Politics of Kyrgyzstan
Kyrgyzstan